Barber v Somerset CC [2004] UKHL 13 is a UK labour law case, concerning wrongful dismissal.

Facts
Heard along with the Hatton case, Mr Barber was a maths teacher at East Bridgwater Community School (previously Sydenham Comprehensive School) who had to take on more work given funding cuts, and was working between 61 and 70 hours a week. He was head of department but then had to become the ‘Mathematical Area of Experience Co-ordinator’. He took off three weeks, and returned. The employer was unsympathetic. His work worsened and then Mr Barber had a mental collapse in November 1996, and took early retirement at 52 in March 1997.

First Instance awarded £101,000 in general and special damages.

Judgment
Lord Hope and Lord Rodger gave short opinions. Lord Walker held that Mr Barber should receive £72,547 for the employer's breach of duty by failing to take steps to ensure his health was sound following his three-week break. The school managers should have reassessed Mr Barber's workload for the sake of his health.

Lord Bingham, Lord Steyn concurred with Lord Walker.

References

United Kingdom labour case law
House of Lords cases
2004 in British law
2004 in case law
Somerset County Council